The Aruban People's Party (AVP;) is a Christian-democratic political party in Aruba founded in 1942. AVP is an acronym for the Dutch name of the party.

At the 2001 elections, on 28 September 2001, the party won 26.7% of popular votes or 6 out of 21 seats. On 23 September 2005, the party won 38% of the popular vote or 8 out of 21 seats, making it the largest opposition party of the nation. In the 25 September 2009 election, the party came to power, winning 48% of the popular vote and 12 of the 21 seats. It held a majority in the Estates of Aruba obtaining 13 seats.

In the 2017 general election the AVP lost four of its thirteen seats in the Parliament of Aruba, with both the AVP and MEP winning 9 seats each respectively, neither party had a majority in Parliament, until the formation of the coalition. AVP leader Mike Eman subsequently announced that he would resign the leadership of the AVP and that the AVP would become an opposition party.

in the 2021 general election the AVP lost 2 of its nine seats in the Parliament, subsequently losing the election

References

Christian democratic parties in North America
Political parties in Aruba
Protestant political parties
1942 establishments in Curaçao and Dependencies
Political parties established in 1942
Conservative parties